Toribio Losoya (also known as Toribio Losoya, An Unsung Hero of the Alamo, or simply Losoya) is an outdoor bronze sculpture depicting the former Mexican soldier and Alamo defender of the same name by local artist William Easley, installed in San Antonio, in the U.S. state of Texas. The statue was donated by the Adolph Coors Co. in 1986 to commemorate the 150th anniversary of the Battle of the Alamo.

See also

 1986 in art

References

External links
 

1986 establishments in Texas
1986 sculptures
Bronze sculptures in Texas
Monuments and memorials in Texas
Outdoor sculptures in San Antonio
Sculptures of men in Texas
Statues in Texas